Kim Minjae (born 15 November 1996) is a South Korean professional footballer who plays as a centre-back for  club Napoli and the South Korea national team. Considered one of the best defenders in Europe, he is known for his strength, aggressive defending and ability to read opponents.

Early life
Kim was born in Tongyeong. Both of his parents are former athletes and his brother was also a footballer who played as a goalkeeper for Myongji University.

Kim started his youth football career with the football club of Tongyeong Elementary School. He later transferred to Gaya Elementary School in Haman and graduated from there. He entered Yeoncho Middle School and Suwon Technical High School which has produced many international footballers such as Park Ji-sung and Kim Sun-min.

After he graduated from high school in 2015, he went on to Yonsei University. In July 2016, when he was sophomore, he dropped out of school to fulfill his dream of making his professional debut, although Yonsei University tried to dissuade him.

Club career

Gyeongju KHNP
Kim joined semi-professional club Gyeongju KHNP on 1 July 2016, and participated in the Korea National League since the middle of the 2016 season. Kim played 15 matches for KHNP until the end of the regular season, leading his team to the play-offs.

On 2 November, Kim played the quarter-final game of the play-offs for 78 minutes, contributing to a 2–0 victory over Changwon City. On 5 November, however, he failed to help KHNP advance to the final despite playing as a full-time player in the semi-final game against Hyundai Mipo Dockyard.

Jeonbuk Hyundai Motors
On 22 December 2016, Kim joined K League club Jeonbuk Hyundai Motors on a free transfer. Jeonbuk manager Choi Kang-hee expressed his expectancy about him during the pre-season training camps in Dubai, and used him as a key player from the beginning.

Kim made his debut goal for his career in a K League 1 match against Daegu FC on 25 June 2017. He scored his second goal for Jeonbuk against Gwangju FC with a mid-range volley on 19 August. He was ousted from the game against Sangju Sangmu for warnings accumulated on 20 September. On 15 October, it turned out that Kim suffered a semilunar valve injury and for this reason Kim had to have surgery in Japan, being unable to play remaining games of the season. With his performance, he was named the K League Young Player of the Year and nominated for a part of the K League Best XI, although he was shown nine yellow cards and one red card during 29 appearances.

Kim made his first AFC Champions League debut in a 3–2 victory over Kashiwa Reysol on 13 February 2018. Kim scored his first goal of the 2018 season with a header as well as showing strong defense in a K League 1 match against FC Seoul on 18 March, and was named the MVP of the week. Afterwards, he led Jeonbuk's defense to six consecutive clean sheets. Unfortunately, however, Kim suffered from a fibula injury in a match against Daegu FC on 2 May, absenting himself from the 2018 FIFA World Cup.

Beijing Guoan
On 29 January 2019, Kim transferred to Beijing Sinobo Guoan. With his impressive defensive performance, Kim went on to play an integral role in Beijing's runner-up finish in the 2019 CSL Season.

In May 2020, Kim engendered controversy by expressing dissatisfaction about Beijing teammates' method of play in a YouTube channel, which was being operated by a South Korean football commentator, after his wedding in South Korea. At a similar time, he received intensive attention from a wide range of European clubs, and Tottenham Hotspur manager José Mourinho tried to recruit him. However, Tottenham didn't want to pay more than €5 million for Kim, and it failed to negotiate with Beijing, which demanded €10 million.

Fenerbahçe
Kim transferred to Fenerbahçe on 16 August 2021 with a transfer fee of €3 million and signed a 4-year contract.

Kim won the most number of unclaimed balls and won the most tackles among Fenerbahçe defenders in his first match for Fenerbahçe against Antalyaspor on 22 August. He made his European debut in the UEFA Europa League Group D match against Eintracht Frankfurt on 16 September. Two days after receiving his first red card in the Süper Lig against Trabzonspor on 17 October, Kim said "This was a first for me in my 5-year career playing football at the highest level, I guess we have to have such experiences in Turkey." Kim led Fenerbahçe to a 2-1 victory by making the most passes and blocks in the Intercontinental Derby on 21 November, and was selected as the man of the match by Fenerbahçe fans with 76.3 percent of the votes. Kim scored his first goal for Fenerbahçe against Konyaspor on 20 March 2022. At the end of the 2021–22 season, International Centre for Sports Studies (CIES), FIFA 22 and Opta Sports selected Kim for the Süper Lig Team of the Season.

Napoli
On 27 July 2022, Kim signed for Serie A club Napoli for a reported fee of €18.05 million, as a replacement for Kalidou Koulibaly, who departed to join Chelsea. He was named Serie A player of the month for September 2022, in his second month at Italy.

International career
On 14 August 2017, Kim was named in South Korea's squad for the last two qualifiers for the 2018 World Cup against Iran and Uzbekistan. In a qualifier against Iran on 31 August 2017, Kim made his international debut as a starter and sent off Iranian player Saeid Ezatolahi as well as showing great defense for 84 minutes. On 5 September, Kim played as a full-time player against Uzbekistan, helping South Korea keep one more clean sheet. After these matches, South Korea qualified for the ninth consecutive FIFA World Cup. But he was injured on 8 May 2018 and unable to take part in 2018 FIFA World Cup.

On 1 September 2018, South Korea defeated Japan 2–1 in the gold medal match of the 2018 Asian Games. As a result of this victory, Kim and his teammates received an exemption from military service, reducing the two-year conscription to just a few weeks of basic training.

Style of play
As a central defender, Kim has excellent physical attributes, notably his strength, speed, and flexibility. Kim has a strong predictive ability in defense, and can often start and finish plays when the team advances. His long pass accuracy enables him to immediately hit the ball after the steal to complete a quick counterattack, and his excellent aerial ability and positioning allows him to perform headers to break up opposition attacks and start offensive plays.

Personal life 
January 2021, Kim was appointed as an ambassador for the Purme Foundation. He decided to contribute to the rehabilitation of children with disabilities and the independence of young people with disabilities, and donated ₩50 million.

Career statistics

Club

International

Scores and results list South Korea's goal tally first, score column indicates score after each Kim goal.

Honours 
Jeonbuk Hyundai Motors
 K League 1: 2017, 2018

South Korea U23
 Asian Games: 2018

South Korea
 EAFF Championship: 2019

Individual
 K League 1 Young Player of the Year: 2017
 K League 1 Best XI: 2017, 2018 
 AFC Asian Cup Team of the Tournament: 2019
 EAFF Championship Best Defender: 2019
Serie A Player of the Month: September 2022
AIC Serie A Player of the Month: October 2022

References

External links 

Profile at the S.S.C. Napoli website
 
 
 

1996 births
Living people
Association football central defenders
South Korean footballers
South Korea under-20 international footballers
South Korea under-23 international footballers
South Korea international footballers
Jeonbuk Hyundai Motors players
Beijing Guoan F.C. players
Fenerbahçe S.K. footballers
S.S.C. Napoli players
K League 1 players
Chinese Super League players
Korea National League players
Süper Lig players
Serie A players
People from Tongyeong
Footballers at the 2018 Asian Games
Asian Games medalists in football
Asian Games gold medalists for South Korea
Medalists at the 2018 Asian Games
2019 AFC Asian Cup players
2022 FIFA World Cup players
South Korean expatriate sportspeople in China
Expatriate footballers in China
South Korean expatriate sportspeople in Turkey
Expatriate footballers in Turkey
South Korean expatriate sportspeople in Italy
Expatriate footballers in Italy
Sportspeople from South Gyeongsang Province